= Fairways + Greens =

American golf magazine (1997–2014)

Fairways + Greens was a bi-monthly golf magazine published by Madavor Media in the United States. It was a consumer magazine dedicated to the game of golf and all the elements surrounding it, with particular emphasis on travel, lifestyle, the personalities who shape the game, equipment, accessories, opinion, history and humor. Content covered destinations, golf courses and resorts in the United States and internationally. It was in circulation between 1997 and 2014.

== History ==
Fairways + Greens was established in 1997 in Reno, Nevada, with coverage originally limited to Northern Nevada and parts of Northern California. The magazine was acquired by new ownership in 2000, then sold to two editorial employees in 2004. In 2006 the magazine underwent a complete redesign and was repositioned as a "super-regional" covering all of the American West. Madavor Media, a small enthusiast magazine publishing company based in Quincy, Massachusetts, took over ownership in 2010, adding an East Coast version of Fairways + Greens for several months and finally combining both editions into one national publication.

In 2012, the magazine was renamed GolfGetaways and the first issue under this name appeared on November 6, 2012. The editors of the magazine acquired Madavor Media LLC through Intermountain Golf Travel, LLC. The last print issue appeared in August 2014. Then it began to produce monthly digital editions on the online platforms, including Apple, Amazon and Google Play, beginning September 8, 2014.

== Recognition ==
In 2006 Fairways + Greens won first place honors in the category of "Best Consumer Redesign" from the annual Folio: Eddie and Ozzie Awards. From 2005 to 2011, Fairways + Greens has won numerous First Place and Outstanding Achievement Awards from the International Network of Golf in several writing categories including travel, opinion, profile, equipment and fashion, along with photography and illustration.
